Seyyed Nur (also Romanized as Seyyed Nūr) is a village in Kheybar Rural District, Choghamish District, Dezful County, Khuzestan Province, Iran. At the 2006 census, its population was 1,342, in 279 families.

References 

Populated places in Dezful County